Pyrausta occidentalis is a moth in the family Crambidae. It is found on Curaçao.

References

Moths described in 1887
occidentalis
Moths of the Caribbean